Lord Richard Buckley (born Richard Myrle Buckley; April 5, 1906 – November 12, 1960) was an American stand-up comedian and recording artist, who in the 1940s and 1950s created a character that was, according to The New York Times, "an unlikely persona ... part English royalty, part Dizzy Gillespie."

Michael Packenham, writing in The Baltimore Sun, described him as "a magnificent stand-up comedian ... Buckley's work, his very presence, projected the sense that life's most immortal truths lie in the inextricable weaving together of love and irony—affection for all humanity married to laughter."

Buckley's unique stage persona anticipated aspects of the Beat Generation sensibility, and influenced contemporary figures as various as Dizzy Gillespie, Lenny Bruce, Wavy Gravy, Del Close, and, even after Buckley's death, Ken Kesey, George Harrison, Tom Waits, Frank Zappa, Robin Williams, and Jimmy Buffett. Bob Dylan, in his book Chronicles, said "Buckley was the hipster bebop preacher who defied all labels."

Early life
Buckley's father, William Buckley, was from Manchester, England.  He stowed away on a ship that eventually arrived in San Francisco. In California, William met Annie Bone. They married, and their son, Richard, was born in Tuolumne, in a mountainous region where lumbering was a major industry.  As children, Buckley and his sister, Nell, would often perform on the streets of Tuolumne, singing for change from passersby.  When he was a bit older, Buckley got a job in the local lumber camps as a "tree topper", which was considered an especially dangerous position. It involved climbing up to the very top of a tall tree, cutting off the tip and then securing ropes that would guide the rest of the tree as it was felled.

Career
By the mid-1930s, he was performing as emcee in Chicago at Leo Seltzer's dance marathons at the Chicago Coliseum, and worked his own club, Chez Buckley, on Western Avenue through the early 1940s.  During World War II, Buckley performed extensively for armed services on USO tours, where he formed a lasting friendship with Ed Sullivan.

In the 1950s, Buckley hit his stride with a combination of exaggeratedly aristocratic bearing and carefully enunciated rhythmic hipster slang. He was known for wearing a waxed mustache along with white tie and tails.  He sometimes wore a pith helmet. Occasionally performing to music, he punctuated his monologues with scat singing and sound effects. His most significant tracks are retellings of historical or legendary events, like "My Own Railroad" and "The Nazz". The latter, first recorded in 1952, describes Jesus' working profession as "carpenter kitty."  Other historical figures include Gandhi ("The Hip Gahn") and the Marquis de Sade ("The Bad-Rapping of the Marquis de Sade, the King of Bad Cats"). He retold several classic documents such as the Gettysburg Address and a version of Edgar Allan Poe's "The Raven." In "Mark Antony's Funeral Oration", he recast Shakespeare's "Friends, Romans, countrymen, lend me your ears" as "Hipsters, flipsters and finger-poppin' daddies: knock me your lobes."
Reportedly, some of his comedic material was written for him by Hollywood "beatnik" Mel Welles.

Lord Buckley appeared on Groucho Marx's popular TV program You Bet Your Life in 1956. In 1959, he voiced the beatnik character Go Man Van Gogh in "Wildman of Wildsville", an episode of the Bob Clampett animated series Beany and Cecil. (The character reappeared in several episodes made after Buckley's death, when he was voiced by Scatman Crothers.)

Buckley adopted his "hipsemantic" delivery from his peers Cab Calloway, Louis Armstrong, Redd Foxx, Pearl Mae Bailey, Count Basie, and Frank Sinatra, as well as Hipsters and the British aristocracy.

Buckley enjoyed smoking marijuana. He wrote reports of his first experiences with LSD, under the supervision of Dr. Oscar Janiger, and of his trip in a United States Air Force jet.

Personal life
Lord Buckley claimed to have been married many times. He had a son, Fred Buckley. His final marriage was to dancer Elizabeth Hanson, with whom he had daughter Laurie and son Richard.

Death
In the autumn of 1960, Buckley's manager Harold L. Humes organized a series of club dates in New York City as well as for him to make another appearance on The Ed Sullivan Show (that was broadcast from the Ed Sullivan Theater in New York). However, on October 19, 1960, while Buckley was making a public appearance at the Jazz Gallery in St. Mark's Place in Manhattan, the New York Police Department (NYPD) stopped him over allegations he had "falsified information" on his application to get a New York City cabaret card; specifically he had omitted to record a 1941 arrest for marijuana possession. Cabaret cards had been a legal requirement since Prohibition for anyone, including performers, who wished to work in New York's nightclubs or the entertainment industry. Because working without a license could mean arrest, revoking cards could permanently end careers – a threat that had been used in the past for political purposes or to solicit payoffs from performers.

At a hearing two days later to have his card reinstated, Buckley was supported by more than three dozen major figures in the entertainment and arts world. However, it developed into a confrontation between NYPD Commissioner Stephen P. Kennedy and Buckley's friends and supporters, including Quincy Jones, George Plimpton and Norman Mailer.

Three weeks later, on November 12, 1960, Buckley died from a stroke at New York City's Columbus Hospital. His funeral was at the Frank E. Campbell Funeral Chapel at 81st Street and Madison Avenue in New York City on November 16, 1960. Buckley was cremated at the Ferndale Cemetery in Hartsdale, New York. The scandal of Buckley's death, partially attributed to the seizure of his cabaret card, helped lead to the removal of authority over cabaret cards from the police to the Licensing Department.

Legacy
Ed Sullivan reflected, "he was impractical as many of his profession are, but the vivid Buckley will long be remembered by all of us."

"The jingle-jangle morning" in "Mr. Tambourine Man" is a phrase Bob Dylan said he took from Lord Buckley. from  the line, "Jingle jangle bells all over", in "Scrooge."

Early in his career Dylan performed "Black Cross", one of Lord Buckley's signature pieces, originally written in 1948 by Joseph S. Newman. Dylan's version is one of the tracks on the 1969 bootleg recording Great White Wonder.

Composer David Amram composed a concerto for alto saxophone and orchestra titled Ode to Lord Buckley, and dedicated it to Buckley's memory.

Arlo Guthrie has cited Lord Buckley and Bill Cosby as the primary inspirations behind his magnum opus, "Alice's Restaurant".

George Harrison's solo song "Crackerbox Palace" was inspired by Buckley's former home in Los Angeles. The song mentions Buckley in the line "know well the Lord is well and inside of you", as well as Buckley's manager George Grief.

Jimmy Buffett performed a version of Buckley's "God's Own Drunk" on his 1974 album Living and Dying in 3/4 Time and it became a signature piece for him until the release of Margaritaville in 1977. On his 1978 live album You Had to Be There, Buffett states that the song is performed "with much respect to Lord Richard Buckley."  Buffett has performed his version less frequently since being sued for copyright infringement by Buckley's son in 1983.  This lawsuit prompted the writing of "The Lawyer and the Asshole".

In his acceptance speech at the Second Annual Comedy Hall Of Fame Awards, comedian George Carlin mentioned a long list of his comedy influences, and ended with "the great, great, great Lord Buckley". This can be heard in the televised show.

In November 2015, City Lights released a new edition of Hiparama of the Classics. First published in 1960, this new expanded edition contains, in addition to Buckley's hip-semantic raps, a new foreword by Al Young and photographs by music photographers Jim Marshall, Jerry Stoll, amongst others.

A feature-length documentary, Too Hip for the Room: The Righteous Reign of Lord Buckley was released in 2016.

Memorial
On December 5, 1960, largely on the initiative of WEVD's Mort Fega, a jazz memorial tribute to the late Buckley—as well as a benefit fundraiser for his widow and children—was held at the same venue in which he had last performed, the Jazz Gallery in New York. Participants included, among others, Ornette Coleman, Dizzy Gillespie, Dizzy Reece, Thelonious Monk, Ed Blackwell, Nick Stabulas and Babs Gonzales, as well as comedians Orson Bean and Larry Storch. For the occasion, at least two original compositions were unveiled, with Gonzales debuting "Old McDonald Did the Twist" and Monk performing "The Lord Buckley Blast."

Samples in music
Buckley's work has been sampled by Jaylib and Madvillain. 

 A quote from 'The Gasser', saying "They didn't know where they was going but they knew where they was, wasn't it", was sampled in "Everyday Robots" by British singer and Blur frontman Damon Albarn, the lead single from his debut solo album of the same name. 
 Coldcut's "70 Minutes of Madness" mix contains a sample of Buckley's monologue on religion.
 Buckley's "hipsters, flipsters and finger poppin' daddies" line was sampled by The Waterboys in their song "Where The Action Is."

Discography
Only four albums, and three singles were released in his lifetime, but many collections have been released since, including:

 Hipsters, Flipsters and Finger Poppin' Daddies Knock Me Your Lobes, RCA Victor, catalog #'s LPM-3246 (10" 33 rpm LP) and EPB-3246 (7" 45 rpm two EP record set), 1955
 Euphoria, Vaya Records, catalog # VLP 101/2, 1955 (recorded 1951)
 Euphoria Volume II, Vaya Records, catalog # LVP-107/108, 1956 (recorded 1954)
 Way Out Humor, World Pacific, catalog # WP-1279, 1959
 Buckley's Best, Liberty, catalog # LBS 83191E, 1960
 Parabolic Revelations Of The Late Lord Buckley, Pye Records/Nonesuch, catalog # PPL 208, 1963
 The Best of Lord Buckley, Crestview Records, catalog # CRV-801 (mono), 1963
 Lord Buckley In Concert, World Pacific, catalog # WP-1815, 1964
 Blowing His Mind (and yours too), World Pacific, catalog # WP-1849, 1966
 The Best of Lord Buckley, Elektra Records, catalog # EKS-74047, 1969
 The Bad Rapping of the Marquis De Sade, World Pacific, catalog # WPS-21889, 1969	
 a most immaculately hip aristocrat, Straight Records / Reprise, catalog # STS-1054 / RS-6389, 1970

References

Further reading
 Trager, Oliver. Dig Infinity: The Life and Art of Lord Buckley, Welcome Rain Publishers (2002); 
 Goldman, Albert. Posthumous Stardom for a Once and Future Lord: The Lord Buckley Phenomenon, Life Magazine, December 19, 1969.
 Levitan, Jack. His Royal Hipness. Eichler Network.

External links
 – official site, includes his biographical material, discography, transcriptions, and an extensive archive of writings

Wig Bubbles – site containing some accurate transcribings of Lord Buckley's hipsemanticisms
The Nazz audio recording of Buckley's comic recapitulation of the Life of Christ

1906 births
1960 deaths
American satirists
American stand-up comedians
People from Tuolumne County, California
Entertainers from California
American people of English descent
Male actors from California
20th-century American male actors
Journalists from California
Comedians from California
20th-century American comedians
20th-century American journalists
American male journalists